Branko Špoljar (5 January 1914 - 27 October 1985) was a Yugoslav actor. He appeared in more than thirty films from 1944 to 1982.

Selected filmography

References

External links 

1914 births
1985 deaths
Yugoslav male actors